= International Federation for Family Development =

The International Federation for Family Development (IFFD) is a non-governmental organization that aims to provide training in parenting. It has General Consultative Status with the United Nations' Economic and Social Council (ECOSOC).

It arose from the Fondation Internationale de la Famille, founded at the III International Family Congress held in Rome in October, 1978. The IFFD itself was founded at the 14th International Family Congress held in Orlando, Florida in 1998.

The chairman is Jim Morgan of the United States, and the president is Marina Robben of Belgium.
